Pseudoridolfia is a genus of flowering plants belonging to the family Apiaceae.

Its native range is Morocco.

Species:
 Pseudoridolfia fennanei Reduron, Mathez & S.R.Downie

References

Apioideae